Heup Young Kim (Kim, Hŭb-yŏng; 김흡영 金洽榮, b. 1949, South Korea) is a Korean Christian theologian and a scholar of East Asian religions (Confucianism and Taoism), specialized in Asian constructive theology, interfaith dialogue, and religion and science. He is the founding director of the Korea Forum for Science and Life and was the Distinguished Asian Theologian in Residence at Graduate Theological Union. He was Professor of Systematic Theology at Kangnam University in South Korea where he also served as a dean of the College of Humanities and Liberal arts, the Graduate School of Theology, and the University Chapel. Kim is one of the founding members and fellows of the International Society for Science and Religion and an Advisor to the Yale Forum on Religion and Ecology. He was a co-moderator of the 6th and 7th Congress of Asian Theologians and a president of the Korean Society of Systematic Theology.

Early life 
After graduating from the Engineering College of Seoul National University, he worked as an airplane mechanic for Korean Air Lines and then was hired to work in the Planning Office of Daewoo Corporation. During the Korean economic boom of the 1970s, he became a representative of Samhwa Corporation in New York City, a general trading company (import/export) for many products, such as shoes and silk. Then, he had a religious conversion from Confucianism to Christianity, which made him dramatically move into theological studies.

Academic life 
He earned a M.Div. and Th.M. from Princeton Theological Seminary, and a Ph.D. from the Graduate Theological Union in Berkeley, California (directed by Claude Welch). He has carried out extensive research in the areas of Asian constructive theology, interreligious dialogue, comparative theology, and science and religion dialogue. He was a senior fellow at the Center for the Study of World Religions in Harvard University and the Center for Interdisciplinary Study of Monotheistic Religions in Doshisha University, a visiting fellow at the Centre for Advanced Religious Theological Studies in the University of Cambridge and the University of Oxford, as well as a visiting scholar at the Center for Theology and the Natural Sciences (CTNS) in the Graduate Theological Union.

Kim has received numerous honors and awards, including the Graduate Theological Union Alum of the Year for 2009, the Global Perspectives on Science and Spirituality (2005-6), John Templeton Research grant (2004-5), and Kangnam University Most Distinguished Research Professor Award (2003).

He has published numerous works in the areas of interfaith dialogue, theology of religions, Asian theology, and science and religion, including monographs such as Wang Yang-ming and Karl Barth: A Confucian-Christian Dialogue (1996), Christ and the Tao (2003), and A Theology of Dao (2017); and chapters such as in The Cambridge Companion to the Trinity (2011), Religion and Transhumanism: The Unknown Future of Human Enhancement (2015), Many Yet One? Multiple Religious Belonging (2016), The Wiley Blackwell Companion to Religion and Ecology (2017), The Bloomsbury Handbook of Religion and Nature (2018), The Oxford Handbook of the Bible in Korea (2022), and The T&T Clark Companion to the Doctrine of Creation (forthcoming).

References

External links
Interview: GTU Alum of the Year

Members of the International Society for Science and Religion
Converts to Christianity
Graduate Theological Union
Princeton Theological Seminary alumni
Seoul National University alumni
South Korean Christians
1949 births
Living people
Harvard Divinity School faculty
World Christianity scholars
South Korean theologians